David Pryor Adickes (born 1927, Huntsville, Texas) is a modernist sculptor and painter. His most famous work is the 67-foot tall A Tribute to Courage statue of Sam Houston in Huntsville, Texas.

Life and career
Adickes was born in Huntsville, Texas in 1927.

In 1949, Adickes travelled to France to study under Fernand Léger. After two years, he returned to Texas and began presenting his work. In 1955, Adickes was commissioned to paint a large historical mural of the city for the then-new Houston Club. That fall, he was hired to teach in the Art Department of the University of Texas at Austin.

In 1983, after being a fulltime painter and art instructor for more than two decades, Adickes was commissioned to make his first monumental sculpture. He created the Virtuoso, a 36-foot steel and concrete statue of a string trio. It is displayed in Houston. In 1986, he created Cornet as a stage prop for the New Orleans World Fair. In 1994, he created A Tribute to Courage in memory of Houston's namesake, Sam Houston. In 2004, he created 43 large busts of American presidents at Presidents Park, Virginia. In 2006, he erected 60-foot statue of Stephen F. Austin in Brazoria County, Texas. In 2012, he turned his old high school in Huntsville into the Adickes Art Foundation Museum.

Gallery of selected works

Museum Collections 

 Art Museum of Southeast Texas, Beaumont, Texas

References

External links

Living people
1927 births
Sculptors from Texas